The Department of External Affairs was an Australian government department that existed between January 1901 and November 1916. It was one of seven Departments of State to be established at federation.

Scope
The first Administrative Arrangements Order, issued 1901, outlined the functions of the Department:
Fisheries - extraterritorial
Naturalisation and aliens
Immigration and emigration
Influx of criminals
External affairs
Pacific Islands
High Commissioner
Communications with States
Governor-General and Executive Council offices
Officers of Parliament

Structure
The Department was a Commonwealth Public Service department, staffed by officials who were responsible to the Minister for External Affairs. The Prime Minister's Office was attached to the Department of External Affairs until 1909.

The Secretary of the Department was Atlee Hunt.

References

Ministries established in 1901
External Affairs